Luiro is a Finnish surname. Notable people with the surname include:

 Tauno Luiro (1932–1955), Finnish ski jumper
 Erkki Luiro (1940–1984), Finnish skier
 Jarkko Luiro (born 1998), Finnish footballer

Finnish-language surnames